Merrick Brook is a stream that runs through the towns of Scotland, Hampton, and Chaplin, Connecticut. It begins at an unnamed pond in eastern Chaplin and flows down into the Shetucket River at the very southern part of Scotland. It flows through Clark's Corner, Hampton, and the center of Scotland. It offers many wild trout for fishing.

Crossings 
All crossings are in Windham County, Connecticut.

References & Citations 

Rivers of Windham County, Connecticut
Rivers of Connecticut
Tributaries of the Thames River (Connecticut)
Chaplin, Connecticut
Hampton, Connecticut
Scotland, Connecticut